GTFM is a community radio station serving Rhondda Cynon Taf in south Wales. The station broadcasts locally on 107.9 FM in the Pontypridd, Taf Ely and lower Rhondda areas, 107.1FM in Aberdare and 100.7FM in Mountain Ash. The station is also available online via the station's website, from studios and offices on Pinewood Avenue in Rhydyfelin, near Pontypridd.

The station was started in 1999 by the local Glyntaff Tenants and Residents Association as a community project run by local enthusiasts. In partnership with the University of Glamorgan, it launched a full-time station GTFM 106.9 under an Access Radio experiment and following full evaluation was licensed as the first community radio station in Wales under OFCOM's changed rules in 2006.

The station's OFCOM license commits it to:

65% music, 35% speech in daytime
60s to present music in daytime, a range of specialist music styles in the evenings and at weekends
Content mostly in English with some Welsh language programming
Live broadcasting at least 12 hours a day on weekdays, 11 hours on Saturdays and 8 hours on Sundays
All of content is produced in the station's studios except the Cardiff City Phone In which is produced at the University of South Wales

The station is also expected to provide training, encourage volunteering and deliver other social gains to the local community.

According to a local MP, Chris Bryant, GTFM is the most popular local station in the area.

Programming 
The majority of GTFM's output consists of locally produced programming including hourly local news bulletins, peak time travel updates and regular sports coverage, plus local features & interviews and specialist programming at evenings and on weekends.

The station also broadcasts Welsh language programmes three days a week alongside a weekday news bulletin from 3pm simulcast from BBC Radio Cymru. National bulletins from Sky News Radio in London are also broadcast during off-peak hours.

References

External links 
Official website

Community radio stations in the United Kingdom
Radio stations in Wales
Radio stations established in 1999
Rhondda Cynon Taf
1999 establishments in Wales